The 1955 National Football League draft was held January 27–28, 1955 at the Warwick Hotel in New York City.

This was the ninth year that the first overall pick was a bonus pick determined by lottery. With the previous eight winners ineligible from the draw, only the Baltimore Colts, Chicago Cardinals, Green Bay Packers, and Pittsburgh Steelers had an equal chance of winning. The draft lottery was won by Baltimore, who selected quarterback George Shaw.

Player selections

Round one

Round two

Round three

Round four

Round five

Round six

Round seven

Round eight

Round nine

Round ten

Round eleven

Round twelve

Round thirteen

Round fourteen

Round fifteen

Round sixteen

Round seventeen

Round eighteen

Round nineteen

Round twenty

Round twenty-one

Round twenty-two

Round twenty-three

Round twenty-four

Round twenty-five

Round twenty-six

Round twenty-seven

Round twenty-eight

Round twenty-nine

Round thirty

Hall of Famers
 Johnny Unitas, quarterback from the University of Louisville taken 9th round 102nd overall by the Pittsburgh Steelers.
Inducted: Professional Football Hall of Fame class of 1979.

Notable undrafted players

References

External links
 NFL.com – 1955 Draft
 databaseFootball.com – 1955 Draft
 Pro Football Hall of Fame

National Football League Draft
Draft
NFL Draft
NFL Draft
1950s in Manhattan
American football in New York City
Sporting events in New York City
Sports in Manhattan